A patronymic or patronym is a component of a personal name based on the given name of a male ancestor.

Patronymic may also refer to:

Patronymic suffix, a suffix to indicate the patronymic derivation
Patronymic surname, a  surname originated from the name of the father
Patronym (taxonomy), a scientific name honoring a person or persons